Sir George Bailey Sansom  (28 November 1883 – 8 March 1965) was a British diplomat and historian of pre-modern Japan, particularly noted for his historical surveys and his attention to Japanese society and culture.

Early life
Sansom was born in London, where his father was a naval architect, but was educated in France and Germany, including the University of Giessen and the University of Marburg. He passed an examination for the Diplomatic Service in September 1903.

Diplomatic service
Sansom first arrived in Japan in 1904 and was attached to the British legation in Tokyo to learn the Japanese language. While he was working as private secretary to Sir Claude Maxwell MacDonald the legation gained higher status by becoming an embassy, and Sansom was present during the negotiations for the renewal of the Anglo-Japanese Alliance in 1905. He spent the majority of his diplomatic career in Japan, working in consulates all over the country while also picking up the language.

Sansom began his literary career in 1911 with a translation of the Tsurezuregusa by Yoshida Kenkō, a major text of the Kamakura period.

Sansom was on leave in London in 1915, but was declared unfit for military service in the First World War. He was assigned by the Foreign Office to the War Office to undertake political espionage, and was sent to Archangel in Russia. He was married the following year.

Sansom returned to Japan in January 1920 as Secretary to Sir Charles Eliot, whose interest in Japanese Buddhism spurred Sansom's own interest in Japanese history and culture. He was thus encouraged to follow in the footsteps of his scholarly predecessors among British diplomats in Japan, such as Ernest Mason Satow, William George Aston and John Harington Gubbins. The position also gave Sansom access to many Japanese scholars as well as political leaders.

Sansom was promoted to Commercial Secretary from 1923. In 1926 Sansom was awarded the CMG (Companion of the Order of St. Michael and St. George). He was divorced in June 1927, but remarried at the end of May the following year.

Also in 1928, Sansom published An Historical Grammar of Japanese. He followed this in 1931 with Japan: A Short Cultural History and in 1935 with a new edition of Sir Charles Eliot's Japanese Buddhism, which had been left incomplete at the time of Eliot's death.

In January 1930 Sansom was promoted to Commercial Counsellor, in charge of improving trade relations. He visited the Philippines in 1932. In 1933 Sir Francis Oswald Lindley assigned him the task of negotiating a commercial treaty between British India and Japan. Sansom was made a member of the Japan Academy in 1934 and in 1935 he was promoted to Knight Commander within the Order of St. Michael and St. George.

As relations between Britain and Japan continued to deteriorate Sansom's reputation as a Japanophile came to be perceived as a liability. Although the Ambassador, Sir Robert Clive, continued to rely on Sansom, his successor from 1937, Robert Craigie, was less receptive to his advice. In 1935 Sansom took a leave of absence of six months, which he spent at Columbia University in New York as a lecturer. While he was on leave in London he announced his retirement from the Diplomatic Service with effect from September 1940. He agreed to return to Japan for one more mission before taking up a position waiting for him at Columbia University.

Wartime service
Following the outbreak of the Second World War, Sansom was sent to Washington, D.C. and then to Singapore, speaking to leading officials in the Royal Navy as an adviser on economic warfare. He was later appointed as a civilian representative on the Far East War Council. Evacuated to Java after the fall of Singapore, he was attached to the headquarters of General Archibald Wavell, but after the fall of Java to the Japanese Sansom was evacuated to Australia, and from there back to Washington, D.C., where he remained until the end of the war as a Minister Plenipotentiary attached to the British Embassy.

Post-war career
Sansom was the British representative on the Far Eastern Commission, which formally oversaw the Allied Occupation of Japan. He revisited Japan in 1946.

Sansom retired in 1947, and was awarded the Knight Grand Cross of the Order of the British Empire. From then until 1953 he was a professor of Japanese studies at Columbia University and also became the first Director of the East Asia Institute. He published The Western World and Japan: A Study in the Interaction of European and Asiatic Cultures in 1949, and visited Japan in 1950 to give a series of lectures.

In 1955 Sansom retired to Palo Alto, California, home of Stanford University. Stanford University Press which had published his Japan: A Short Cultural History in 1931, and also published A History of Japan in three volumes, between 1958 and 1963. He was made an honorary fellow of the Japan Academy in 1951.

Sansom died on 8 March 1965 while on a visit to Tucson, Arizona. His second wife, Katherine Sansom, herself an author on Japanese topics, published a memoir consisting primarily of Sansom's letters and papers, and her own remembrances.

Works
 Sansom, George Bailey. (1911). The Tsuredzure Gusa of Yoshida No Kaneyoshi, Being the Meditations of a Recluse in the 14th Century.
 _. (1928). An Historical Grammar of Japanese. Oxford: Oxford University Press.
 1946—2nd edition by Oxford University Press, Oxford.
 1968—reprinted by Clarendon Press, Oxford. ASIN: B0007ITUYC
 1995—reprinted by RoutledgeCurzon, London.  (cloth)
 _. (1931).  Japan: A Short Cultural History. London: Cresset Press, 1931, and New York: D. Appleton, 1931.
 _. (1933). Trade Conditions in the Philippine Islands. ASIN B0008D0H5W
 _. (1942). Postwar Relations with Japan. (Secretariat paper) ASIN B0007ETL9K
 _. (1949). The Western World and Japan: A Study in the Interaction of European and Asiatic Cultures. New York: Random House. 
 1973—reprinted Vintage Books, New York. 
 _. (1952). Japan: A Short Cultural History. Stanford: Stanford University Press.  (cloth)  (paper)
 _. (1958).  A History of Japan to 1334. Stanford: Stanford University Press. ; 
 _. (1961).  A History of Japan: 1334–1615. Stanford: Stanford University Press. ; 
 _. (1963).  A History of Japan, 1615–1867. Stanford: Stanford University Press. ; 
 _. (1984). Japan in World History. Tokyo: Tuttle Publishing. ; ASIN B0007IZ02I (cloth) [reprinted 1986.  (paper)]
 _. (19__). The Reminiscences of Sir George Sansom. ASIN B0007J22K0

References
Frederic, Louis (2002). Japan Encyclopedia. Cambridge, Massachusetts: Harvard University Press.
Howes, John F. (1975) "Sir George Sansom and Japan", Review of Pacific Affairs. University of British Columbia.
Sansom, Katharine (1972). Sir George Sansom and Japan: A Memoir. Tallahassee, Florida: The Diplomatic Press Inc.
 Winchester, Simon. (2008). The Man Who Loved China: the Fantastic Story of the Eccentric Scientist Who Unlocked the Mysteries of the Middle Kingdom. New York: Harper. 
Ian Nish, 'Sansom, Sir George Bailey (1883–1965)', Oxford Dictionary of National Biography, Oxford University Press, 2004 accessed 20 March 2013

External links

 "East Asian Studies at Columbia: The Early Years" at Columbia.edu
Oxford Biographical Database

1883 births
1965 deaths
Columbia University faculty
Historians of Japan
British Japanologists
Knights Commander of the Order of St Michael and St George
Knights Grand Cross of the Order of the British Empire
British diplomats
20th-century British historians